Oddup is a data-driven research platform that provides analytical information on startups, their trends, and both current and expected future valuations. It is self-styled as The Startup Rating System and the company states its vision is to disrupt equity research in private companies.

History 
Oddup was founded by James Giancotti and Jackie Lam and is headquartered in Hong Kong. Oddup has offices in the United States, India, Singapore and Australia. The team is composed of former venture capitalists, quantitative analysts, traders, investment bankers and research analysts from top global institutions.  

The rating platform, which was officially launched in March 2015, provides rating scores and analyst recommendations on startups and investors across Asia. Close to 99% of all of Oddup's "Buy" ratings on startups have been known to successfully secure funding from investors within three months. 

Since its web launch in March 2015, the Oddup rating platform has attracted more than 50,000 users with a growth of 20% MoM.

Oddup score and ratings 
The Oddup score is based on an algorithm that pulls together data from a number of components often used in the investment due diligence process: quality, growth, location, investor, market, regulations, valuations and investment returns. Users are able to compare the chosen companies against industry peers and conduct due diligence on market, competitive landscape and other factors. The content is further enriched by fundamental research on potential exits conducted by Oddup's team of analysts.

Oddup is based on the combination of analyst view points and the computed algorithm – then producing the Oddup Score.

The startup rating scores are then offered as views: Buy, Hold, Sell – as is often done in sell-side equity research – with expectation metrics and future valuations.

Track record 
Oddup analysts have in the past predicted WeLab to become the first unicorn (company with valuation of over US$1 billion) in Hong Kong, and this was proven when the Chinese P2P lending platform's US$160 million Series B funding announcement took place on January 21, 2016. Additionally, Oddup has set the record when Google acquired Pie – one of Oddup's Buy rated startups in Singapore – in February 2016.

On January 5, 2017, Malaysian-based mobile classifieds startup Duriana was acquired by Singapore's Carousell (company). Duriana was a Buy rated startup on Oddup in July 2016. 

Lalamove (previously known as EasyVan) raised US$30 million Series B funding on January 10, 2017. The Hong Kong-based logistics startup was rated a Buy by Oddup in September 2016.

Funding 
Oddup announced its successful US$1 million funding in seed round in 2015, and is backed by Click Ventures, Cerebrum Ventures, Kima Ventures, as well as a group of successful angel investors.  Oddup raised an additional US $6 million funding in Series A in 2017 led by Times Internet, White Capital and Moneta Ventures, with participation from 500 Startups.

References 

Software companies of Hong Kong